State Route 125 (SR 125) is an east–west state highway in the southwestern portion of the U.S. state of Ohio.

Heading east from the Cincinnati neighborhoods of Mount Lookout, Linwood, and Mount Washington, State Route 125 passes through numerous subdivisions in Anderson Township as a four lane road, Beechmont Avenue.  After the Clermont County line, State Route 125 becomes Ohio Pike, the old Ohio Turnpike, originally built in 1831 by E.G. Penn, not related to the modern highway of the same name.  Passing under Interstate 275, State Route 125 begins to lose its suburban feel after the villages of Amelia and Hamlet as it heads into the countryside of eastern Clermont, Brown, Adams, and Scioto Counties.

Near its eastern terminus, the route passes through Shawnee State Forest, the largest in the state of Ohio, and by the Shawnee State Lodge and Park, Roosevelt Lake, and Turkey Creek Lake.  This section of State Route 125 is part of the Scenic Scioto Heritage Trail.

See also National Scenic Byway, Ohio Byway, and [https://web.archive.org/web/20061013040137/http://dnr.state.oh.us/parks/parks/pdf/shawnee605.pdf  Shawnee State Forest and Park map]''

History

1946 – Extended to downtown Cincinnati along U.S. Route 50, U.S. Route 52, and State Route 74.
1959 – From its western terminus to Amelia upgraded to 4 lanes.
1962 – State Route 74 renumbered to State Route 32.
1997 – From Interstate 275 to Bethel downgraded from divided highway to 4-lane undivided highway.

Before 1926
Routed from LeSourdesville (south of Middletown to Lebanon along current State Route 63.
1926 – Entire route certified as State Route 63.

Major junctions

References

External links

Ohio Byways

125
Transportation in Brown County, Ohio
Transportation in Clermont County, Ohio
Transportation in Hamilton County, Ohio
Transportation in Adams County, Ohio
Transportation in Scioto County, Ohio
Roads in Cincinnati
U.S. Route 50